Oracle Application Testing Suite is a comprehensive, integrated testing solution for Web applications, Web Services, packaged Oracle Applications and Oracle Databases.

Description/History
The test solution was originally developed by RSW, who was bought by Teradyne that created the software and call center test company Empirix.
Empirix eTest Suite was acquired by Oracle in June 2008 and was rebranded as Oracle Application Testing Suite
 
The Oracle Application Testing Suite is part of the Oracle Enterprise Manager product family and comprises the following tightly integrated products:

 Oracle Load Testing for scalability, performance and load testing.
 Oracle Functional Testing for automated functional and regression testing.
 Oracle Flow Builder is introduced as part of Functional testing along with the Release of OATS 12.3.0
 Oracle Test Manager for test process management, including test requirements management, test management, test execution and defect tracking.

Oracle Application Testing Suite also provides a series of integrated testing accelerators for testing Oracle packaged applications and SOA applications.  
These accelerators enable enhanced scripting capabilities for more efficient and optimized testing.

Supported technology/Applications
Web/HTML, Adobe Flex, Siebel, Oracle E-business Suite, Oracle Fusion Applications, JD Edwards EnterpriseOne, Application Development Framework, Oracle Forms, Web Services, Oracle Databases

Scripting platform
Oracle Application Testing Suite have one unified scripting platform called OpenScript. This is an Eclipse-based scripting platform that provides a graphical user interface and the possibility to extend scripts by using Java code.

Languages
Oracle Functional Testing and Oracle Load Testing both uses the same scripting platform (OpenScript) and scripts may be extended by using the Java programming language.

License models
Oracle Functional Testing is licensed based on NUP (Named User Plus).
Oracle Test Manager is licensed based on NUP (Named user Plus).
Oracle Load Testing is licensed based on:
 Number of processors for the Load Testing Controller
 Number of virtual users to be simulated

The base license covers web applications support. Additional accelerators may be licensed as needed.

Compatibility for Functional Testing
OATS (Oracle Applications Testing Suite) has evolved adding compatibility with different operating systems, Java versions, browsers, etc.

Latest Version of 12.5 supports 

Browsers:
 Record and Playback on 
 IE 8.x, 9.x, 10.x and 11.x
 Firefox (ESR) 10.x, 17.x, 24.x and 31.x
 Playback on
 Chrome 32+
Java Runtime Environment:
 JRE 1.6
 JRE 1.7
 JRE 1.8

Operating System: 32 bit and 64 bit of
 Windows 2003
 Windows 7
 Windows 8
 Windows 2008
 Windows 2008 R2
 Windows 2012 Server

References

External links
 Oracle Application Testing Suite 
 Trial Download
 End-to-End Automation Testing for Oracle Cloud

Software testing tools